The 2003 Masters (officially the 2003 Benson & Hedges Masters) was a professional non-ranking snooker tournament that took place between 2 and 9 February 2003 at the Wembley Conference Centre in London, England.

Paul Hunter, who was aiming to complete a hat-trick of Masters titles, lost 3–6 to Mark Williams in the semi-final. Williams then beat Stephen Hendry 10–4 in the final to win his second Masters title. Hendry made the highest break of the championship with a 144 in his semi-final match against Ken Doherty, but missed out on a 147 during his quarter-final match against local favourite Jimmy White when he failed to pot the final pink.

This was the last Masters to be sponsored by Benson & Hedges after the ban on tobacco advertising which came into effect in summer 2003. Regal's sponsorship of the Scottish Masters, the Welsh Open and the Scottish Open also ended during the 2002/2003 season. However, Embassy continued to sponsor the World Championship until 2005.

A total attendance of 24,329 was the events highest since 1988.

Field
Defending champion Paul Hunter was the number 1 seed with World Champion Peter Ebdon seeded 2. Places were allocated to the top 16 players in the world rankings. Players seeded 15 and 16 played in the wild-card round against the winner of the qualifying event, Mark Davis (ranked 37), and Steve Davis (ranked 25), who was the wild-card selection. Mark Davis, Quinten Hann and Joe Perry were making their debuts in the Masters.

Prize fund
The breakdown of prize money for this year is shown below:
Winner: £210,000
Runner-up: £105,000
Highest break: £22,000
Maximum break: £100,000
Total:  £695,000

Wild-card round

Main draw

Final

Qualifying
The 2002 Masters Qualifying Event was held between 21 and 31 October 2002 at Pontin's in Prestatyn, Wales. The winner of this series of matches, who qualified for the tournament, was Mark Davis.  Tony Drago made his first and to date only maximum break against Stuart Bingham.

Century breaks
Total: 25
 144, 134, 107, 106, 102, 101, 101  Stephen Hendry
 138, 104  Paul Hunter
 122  Quinten Hann
 121, 115, 103, 102, 100  Mark Williams
 117, 101  John Higgins
 112, 105  Ronnie O'Sullivan
 111  Jimmy White
 107, 104  Mark Davis
 104  Steve Davis
 104  Matthew Stevens
 100  Ken Doherty

References

2003
Masters
Masters Snooker
Masters